The Scotch Plains-Fanwood Regional School District is a regional public school district serving students from two communities in Union County, New Jersey, United States. The district serves students in pre-kindergarten through twelfth grade, who come from the Township of Scotch Plains and the Borough of Fanwood. The district has five elementary schools (PreK-Grade 4), two middle schools (Grades 5-8) and a comprehensive high school (Grades 9-12).

As of the 2018–19 school year, the district, comprising eight schools, had an enrollment of 5,649 students and 438.0 classroom teachers (on an FTE basis), for a student–teacher ratio of 12.9:1.

The district is classified by the New Jersey Department of Education as being in District Factor Group "I", the second-highest of eight groupings. District Factor Groups organize districts statewide to allow comparison by common socioeconomic characteristics of the local districts. From lowest socioeconomic status to highest, the categories are A, B, CD, DE, FG, GH, I and J.

Schools 

Schools in the district (with 2018–19 enrollment data from the National Center for Education Statistics) are:
Elementary schools
Howard B. Brunner Elementary School with 414 students in grades PreK-4
Scott Bortnick, Principal
J. Ackerman Coles School with 552 students in grades PreK-4
Sandra Burghgraef-Fehte, Principal
Evergreen School with 402 students in grades PreK-4
Colleen Haubert, Principal
William J. McGinn School with 512 students in grades K-4
Dr. Sasha Slocum, Principal
School One with 401 students in grades PreK-4
Justin Fiory, Principal
Middle schools
Malcolm E. Nettingham Middle School with 909 students in grades 5-8. The school, formerly known as Park Middle School,  was renamed in 2021 to honor Nettingham, who had served with the Tuskegee Airmen.
Dr. Jocelyn Dumaresq, Principal
Kristie Morano, Assistant Principal
Terrill Middle School with 811 students in grades 5-8
Dr. Kevin Holloway, Principal
Raffaele Gerace, Assistant Principal
High school
Scotch Plains-Fanwood High School with 1,574 students in grades 9-12
Dr. David Heisey, Principal
Timothy Donahue, Assistant Principal
Brooke Esposito, Assistant Principal
Ryan Miller, Assistant Principal

Administration
Core members of the district's administration are:
Dr. Joan Mast, Superintendent of Schools
Christopher Jones, Business Administrator and Board Secretary

Board of education
The district's board of education is comprised of nine members, who set policy and oversee the fiscal and educational operation of the district through its administration. As a Type II school district, the board's trustees are elected directly by voters to serve three-year terms of office on a staggered basis, with three seats up for election each year held (since 2012) as part of the November general election. The board appoints a superintendent to oversee the district's day-to-day operations and a business administrator to supervise the business functions of the district. Seats on the board of education are allocated based on the population of the constituent districts, with seven seats assigned to Scotch Plains and two to Fanwood.

References

External links 
Scotch Plains-Fanwood Regional School District

School Data for the Scotch Plains-Fanwood Regional School District, National Center for Education Statistics

Fanwood, New Jersey
Scotch Plains, New Jersey
New Jersey District Factor Group I
School districts in Union County, New Jersey